Mahfuz Ahmed (born 23 October 1967) is a Bangladeshi television and film actor. He is also a television presenter, model and television producer. He won Bangladesh National Film Award for Best Actor twice for his roles in Laal Sobuj (2005) and Zero Degree (2015).

Early life
Ahmed was born on 23 October 1967 at Jagatpur village in Ramganj Upazila of Lakshmipur District.

Career
In 1990, Ahmed started his career inspired by Humayun Ahmed. His notable work is Humayun Ahmed's directed films Srabon Megher Din and Dui Duari, Mohammad Hannas's Bhalobashi Tomake, Chashi Nazrul Islam's film Megher Pore Megh and Taukir Ahmed's Joyjatra. He has his own production house named "Nokshikatha".

Personal life
Since 17 November 2000, Ahmed is married to Ishrat Jahan Quader, a daughter of politician GM Quader. She is a senior lecturer at a private university in Bangladesh. Together they have a daughter, Mourin Aradhya Ahmed (b. 2012), and a son, Marvin Ahmed Aritra (b. 2015).

Filmography

Television appearances

Acted TV drama

Directed TV drama

TV programs

Awards and nominations

References

External links
 
 
 

Living people
1967 births
People from Ramganj Upazila
Bangladeshi male film actors
Bangladeshi male television actors
21st-century Bangladeshi male actors
Best Actor National Film Award (Bangladesh) winners